is a puzzle game for the Nintendo 64 released only in Japan in 1997. The game title is one of the longest on the N64 and translates to Ucchannanchan's Flaming Challenger: Irritating Electric Stick. The game features six increasingly difficult wire mazes which the player has to guide a stick through without touching the walls. The player is awarded crowns from bronze to platinum depending on how fast they can beat each stage. The game does not feature any ending screen or credits.

It is based on a segment of the Japanese game show ; the Neo Geo game The Irritating Maze and the PlayStation game Irritating Stick are based on the same show.

External links
 Official page on Hudson's website

1997 video games
Japan-exclusive video games
Nintendo 64 games
Nintendo 64-only games
Video games based on game shows
Video games developed in Japan
Yuke's games
Hudson Soft games
Multiplayer and single-player video games

ja:イライラ棒#NINTENDO64版